Dewanhat is a village in the Cooch Behar I CD block in the Cooch Behar Sadar subdivision of the Cooch Behar district of West Bengal, India.

Geography

Area overview
The map alongside shows the north-central part of the district. It has the highest level of urbanisation in an overwhelming rural district. 22.08% of the population of the Cooch Behar Sadar subdivision lives in the urban areas and 77.92% lives in the rural areas. The entire district forms the flat alluvial flood plains of mighty rivers.

Note: The map alongside presents some of the notable locations in the subdivision. All places marked in the map are linked in the larger full screen map.

Demographics
As per the 2011 Census of India, Dewanhatmoamari had a total population of 7,460.  There were 3,847 (52%) males and 3,613 (48%) females. There were 684 persons in the age range of 0 to 6 years. The total number of literate people in Dewanhatmoamari was 6,054 (89.34% of the population over 6 years).

Transport
There is a station named Dewanhat Railway Station on the broad gauge Alipurduar-Bamanhat branch line. The nearest airport, Cooch Behar Airport, is 13 km away.

Education
Dewanhat Mahavidyalaya was established in 2007. Affiliated with the Cooch Behar Panchanan Barma University, it offers honours courses in Sanskrit, history, philosophy and political science and a general course in arts.

Healthcare
Dewanhat Rural Hospital, with 30 beds at Dewanhat, is the major government medical facility in the Cooch Behar I CD block.

References

Cities and towns in Cooch Behar district